Voice – Social Democracy (HLAS–SD) is a social-democratic political party in Slovakia. The party was founded in 2020 by former senior members of the left-wing populist Direction – Social Democracy (SMER–SD). It is led by  Peter Pellegrini who served as Prime Minister of Slovakia from 2018 to 2020 and deputy chairman of SMER–SD from 2014 to 2020 In October 2022, it was admitted as an associate member of the Party of European Socialists (PES).

Several members of the party's presidium, including its leader Peter Pellegrini, are associated with bribery and abuse of power in the  testimonies of cooperating defendants. In December 2020, the National Crime Agency charged Peter Žiga, a member of the party's presidium, with bribery.

History 
Party leader Peter Pellegrini joined Direction – Social Democracy (SMER–SD) in 2000. After being elected to the National Council in the 2006 parliamentary election, Pellegrini served in several positions as state secretary, minister and speaker of the National Council. He was elected vice-chairman of SMER–SD in 2014. Pellegrini succeeded Robert Fico as prime minister after the 2018 government crisis triggered by the murder of investigative journalist Ján Kuciak. Fico remained the party chairman.

Pellegrini led SMER–SD electoral list in the 2020 Slovak parliamentary election, while still serving as party vice-chairman. After winning 170,000 more personal votes than Fico, Pellegrini called for a party convention and expressed his intention to run for party chairman.

The political party was announced on 29 June 2020 and registered by the Ministry of the Interior on 11 September 2020. The party was launched by the former prime minister Peter Pellegrini. On the day of the launch of new party, Pellegrini left SMER–SD, along with ten more of the party's members of the National Council. To be registered as a party, it had to obtain 10,000 signatures by 25 December 2020. Pellegrini, Matúš Šutaj Eštok, and Peter Kmec formed the party's preparatory committee, and Pellegrini became the party's chairman. For the time being, the 11 deputies are classified as non-inscrits within the National Council.

According to opinion polling for the next Slovak parliamentary election, Pellegrini is the second most popular Slovak politician. Immediately after the party was formed, its support was about 16%. In October 2020, the party became the most popular for the first time. As of November 2021, the party is still the most popular with stable support around 20%. After Pellegrini visited Olaf Scholz in March 2023, some commentators perceived a shift in the preferred Slovak party of the Party of European Socialists (PES) from SMER–SD to Hlas-SD, due to more radical rhetoric from the former party.

Ideology 
HLAS–SD has a pro-European outlook and wants to promote traditional social-democratic goals within the welfare state. Reflecting a more conservative stance, especially on social issues, the party refuses to promote liberalism on social issues, which it argues are not in demand. Party vice-chairman Erik Tomáš was quoted as saying: "We have a conservative voter if we talk about polls, and I can assure everyone that we have our priorities and they are not opening up some liberal issues."

Voice – Social Democracy has been described as a catch-all party and is often reluctant to take positions opposed by a significant segment of the electorate.

Criminal charges and accusations 

In December 2020, the National Crime Agency charged the incumbent member of the party's presidium and former Minister of Environment in Pellegrini's cabinet Peter Žiga with bribery. According to the testimony of the former Deputy Minister of Justice in Pellegrini's cabinet Monika Jankovská (pleading guilty of bribery and abuse of power), Žiga was to offer a bribe of €100,000 to the judge deciding the international dispute Gabčíkovo–Nagymaros Dams. , Žiga is still charged and his trial is ongoing.

In August 2021, former President of the Financial Administration František Imrecze and IT entrepreneur Michal Suchoba (both pleading guilty of bribery) testified that in 2014, incumbent party leader Peter Pellegrini then serving as Deputy Minister of Finance had asked for and subsequently received a bribe of €150,000 for political support for the adoption of a virtual treasury. , the National Crime Agency has not filed charges in this case. In 2018, Pellegrini had a property case, having bought a luxury apartment in Bratislava for €410,000. According to his property declaration, Pellegrini was to cover €246,000 from his own income and borrow the remainder, despite reports suggesting that since 2006 he has earned a total of €460,000 from public office.

In April 2022, as a part of the testimony of former President of the Financial Administration František Imrecze about an alleged criminal organization led by former prime minister of Slovakia and incumbent leader of Direction – Slovak Social Democracy Robert Fico, the current party deputy chairman Erik Tomáš was to illegally obtain compromising materials on their political rival and then opposition leader Igor Matovič by abusing state bodies,. The National Crime Agency has not filed charges in this case because it is barred by the statute of limitations.

In December 2020, the former President of the Police Force Milan Lučanský, nominated by the former minister of interior in Pellegrini's cabinet, currently serving as deputy leader of the party Denisa Saková, was charged with bribery. During 2018–2019, Lučanský was to receive bribes in the total amount of €510,000. On 30 December 2020, Lučanský committed suicide, so his case was dismissed. In April 2021, IT entrepreneur Michal Suchoba (pleading guilty of bribery) testified that the former deputy prime minister and minister of finance in Pellegrini's cabinet Peter Kažimír was to receive a regular annual bribe of €500,000 regarding IT orders at the Financial Directorate. The National Crime Agency has not filed charges in this case. Kažimír was repeatedly charged with bribing the former President of the Financial Administration František Imrecze in the amount of €50,000. His charge was reinstated in November 2022 after being dismissed by the Attorney General Maroš Žilinka. In May 2022, the former minister of justice in Pellegrini's cabinet Gábor Gál was charged with bribery. As of January 2023, Gál is still charged.

Representation

Deputies of the National Council
As of 2021, the party claims 11 members of the National Council, all of whom are former members of Direction – Social Democracy (SMER–SD) elected for this party.

References 

2020 establishments in Slovakia
Political parties established in 2020
Social democratic parties in Slovakia
Direction – Social Democracy breakaway groups